Edward Purcell is a professional rugby league footballer who represented Samoa in the 2013 World Cup.

Playing career
Purcell played for the Auckland Lions in the 2007 Bartercard Cup grand final winning side.

In 2008 he played 31 games for the New Zealand Warriors side in the Toyota Cup.

He played for the Akarana Falcons in the 2013 National Competition, and was then selected by Samoa for the World Cup.

References

1988 births
New Zealand rugby league players
New Zealand sportspeople of Samoan descent
Samoa national rugby league team players
Auckland rugby league team players
Rugby league props
Rugby league second-rows
Mount Albert Lions players
Living people